Amit Bhalla professionally known as Ninja is an Indian playback singer and actor associated with punjabi music and punjabi cinema. He is Best known for his songs like Aadat, Oh Kyu Ni Jan Sake, Roii Na, Thokda Reha and Gall Jattan Wali. He made his acting debut with the movie Channa Mereya for which he received Filmfare Best Debut Male Award.

Early life 
Ninja hailing from Ludhiana, Punjab. In an interview, Ninja stated that he faced many difficulties during his struggling period. He received his musical training from Ustad Harvinder Bittu Ji in Ludhiana. In his college days, Ninja held a part-time job in the telecom industry.

Discography

Film Songs
 "Wafa" from Jind Mahi (2022)

Filmography

Upcoming 
Good Luck Jatta

Awards

References

External links 

 

Living people
Singers from Punjab, India
21st-century Indian male actors
Punjabi-language singers
Indian Sikhs
1991 births